Kot Nakka is a village located in Pindi Bhattian union council of Hafizabad District in the Punjab Province of Pakistan, it is part of Pindi Bhattian Tehsil.
It is a village located approximately 8 kilometres outside Pindi Bhattian, Punjab, Pakistan. It situated on the Pindi Bhattian-Sangla Hill road.

A government high school for boys and girls is also located heare.

Notable persons

References

Villages in Hafizabad District